Seisonidae is a family of rotifers, found on the gills of Nebalia, a marine crustacean. Peculiar among rotifers, males and females are both present and equal in size. Males and females are similar with paired gonads. It is considered to have diverged from the other rotifers early on, and in one treatment is placed in a separate class Seisonoidea. They have a large and elongate body with reduced corona. Their muscular system is similar to that of other rotifers: they have longitudinal muscles as well as open annular muscles.

Species 
Two genera with total three species belong to Seisonidae:

 Paraseison Plate, 1887
 Paraseison annulatus (Claus, 1876) — ectoparasite of Nebalia
 Seison Grube, 1861
 Seison nebaliae Grube, 1861 – commensal of Nebalia
 Seison africanus Sorensen, Segers & Funch, 2005 — host is unknown.

References

Pararotatoria
Rotifer families